"Tornerò" (Italian for "I Will Return") is a song by the Italian musical group I Santo California, released in 1974 as their debut single. The following year, the down-tempo love ballad became a number-one hit in Italy as well as a top five hit in German speaking countries. In Italy, it spent 3 consecutive weeks at no. 1 in June and July 1975, and was certified gold. In Switzerland, it remained at the top for 6 consecutive weeks in September and October 1975, and was the best-selling single of the year there. The song has been covered by numerous artists in various languages.

Track listing
 7" single
A. "Tornerò" – 4:07
B. "Se davvero mi vuoi bene" – 3:25

Chart performance

Notable cover versions
 In 1975 Michael Holm recorded the song in German as Wart' auf mich (Du, wenn ich dich verlier') (Ariola, 16 225 AT) for his album Wenn ein Mann ein Mädchen liebt (Ariola, 55 606 DT). The song charted at no. 4 in Germany and no. 7 in Switzerland.
 In 1975 Diego Verdaguer y Amigos recorded the song in Castiglian (text by Euterpe) as Volveré (Music Hall, 32.351), in his 1976 album (Music Hall, FI-25). The song sold more than five million of copies.
 Flemish singer Willy Sommers recorded the single of the song in Dutch as Kom terug text by Jan De Vuyst, (Philips Records, 856 780-2) for the 1995 album Profumo d'amore (Scent of love) (Philips Records, 526 590-2). His version reached no. 30 in Belgium.
 In 2009, Austrian singer Sandra Stumptner contributed lyrics to a new German-language cover of the song, "1000 Träume weit (Tornerò)". The single, released under the pseudonym Antonia aus Tirol, charted at no. 89 in Germany. She re-recorded the song in duet with Sascha Heyna in 2013.
 Anna-Maria Zimmermann covered Antonia aus Tirol's version of the song reaching no. 68 in Germany in 2009.

References

1974 debut singles
1974 songs
Amanda Lear songs
Ariola Records singles
Italian songs
Number-one singles in Italy
Number-one singles in Switzerland
Philips Records singles